Arbury Hill, at , is the joint highest point in the English county of Northamptonshire.

The slopes of Arbury Hill are a drainage divide between three major river catchment areas, with the Nene to the north, east and south, the Cherwell (a tributary of the Thames) to the south-west and the Leam (a tributary of the Severn) to the west and north-west. There are fine views with Rugby and Coventry visible to the northwest and Northampton to the east. The River Nene rises in a swampy hollow on the northwestern flanks of the hill.

History
On the summit of Arbury Hill there are the vestiges of an Iron Age Fort, although its date and origin are disputed. The remains are in the form of a square ditch and embankment about 200 metres (yards) across. It is mentioned as one of the in a land grant of Edmund the Elder, as being the place where the three parishes of Badby, Dodford and Everdon meet.

The summit of Arbury Hill was one in a series of points used for triangulation in 1784 to determine the exact diameter and magnitude of the Earth, in a sequence of measurements undertaken by the British Government. There is a Triangulation station on the summit.

There is a motor-cross track on the east side and top of the hill that is used for competitions about three times a year. The soil is clayey, the site is steeply sloping and there are plenty of elevation changes, some off camber turns and a few smallish jumps.

Gallery

References

External links 
Photo of Arbury Hill and the main source of the River Nene

Hill forts in Northamptonshire
Hills of Northamptonshire
Highest points of English counties